is a Japanese murder mystery dōjin soft visual novel series produced by 07th Expansion that comprises the first two entries of the When They Cry franchise. The series focuses on a group of young friends living in the fictional village of Hinamizawa and the strange events that occur there in 1983.

The games are built on the NScripter game engine and the Microsoft Windows operating system. The first game in the series, Onikakushi-hen, was released in August 2002, and the eighth and final game in the original PC series, Matsuribayashi-hen, was released in August 2006. While the first four games carried the overall title Higurashi no Naku Koro ni and are considered the first entry in the When They Cry franchise, the next four games were produced under the title Higurashi no Naku Koro ni Kai and are considered the second entry.

A bonus fan disc called Higurashi no Naku Koro ni Rei was released in December 2006. In addition to the original series, new stories were created in manga form and in video games for the PlayStation 2 and Nintendo DS, in order to expand the story. The original eight PC releases were released in English by MangaGamer between 2009 and 2010. Two sets of drama CDs were produced, one by Wayuta and the other by Frontier Works. Novelizations of the game series were released by Kodansha between August 2007 and March 2009. A manga series adapted from the games began with eight different manga artists working separately on one to three of the multiple story arcs and were published by Square Enix and Kadokawa Shoten. The manga was licensed for release in English in North America by Yen Press under the title Higurashi: When They Cry and the first volume was released in November 2008.

Two anime television series (also known simply as When They Cry prior to 2020) were produced by Studio Deen and directed by Chiaki Kon in 2006 and 2007; a third anime adaptation was released as an original video animation (OVA) series in 2009. The first anime series was licensed by Geneon Entertainment in English in 2007, but the license expired in 2011. Sentai Filmworks has since licensed both anime seasons and the 2009 OVAs. A live-action film adaptation of the series, directed and written by Ataru Oikawa, premiered in Japanese theaters in May 2008, with a sequel released in April 2009. A six-episode live-action television series adaptation premiered in Japan in May 2016, and a four-episode sequel premiered in November 2016. A new anime television series by Passione aired from October 2020 to March 2021, and a sequel aired from July to September 2021.

Gameplay
Higurashi When They Cry is a "sound novel", a variation of visual novel with a focus on sound and atmosphere. Gameplay is restricted to reading individual scenes, during which characters are displayed as static two-dimensional sprites. The versions of the game ported to home consoles additionally feature voice acting provided by professional voice actors. The narrative of the game is divided into separate story arcs, named "chapters", which become accessible in a sequence strictly established by the developers. The narration is conducted on behalf of various characters. After reading a certain amount of text within a chapter, playback ends. At this point, the player is invited to save the game, as well as read "tips" that reveal details of the game's setting that were not present in the main story. The tips may also encourage the player to deduce the reasoning behind the narrative's mysterious events.

The chapters of the game are divided into two categories – "question arcs" and "answer arcs". Each question arc is a self-contained story taking place in an alternate reality, while each answer arc is based on the same scenario as a certain question arc and helps the player formulate a more accurate vision of the events of the pertaining question arc. Each chapter is assigned a "difficulty rating" that indicates the complexity of the mystery. After completing a chapter, all previously opened tips and images of individual scenes in the form of a gallery become available to the player from the main menu. In addition, the player can access a feature entitled the "Staff Room", in which writer Ryukishi07 discusses and examines the chapter, or the "All-Cast Review Session", in which the characters break the fourth wall and debate about the events of the chapter.

Plot

Keiichi soon learns of the village's annual Watanagashi Festival, a celebration dedicated to the local deity Oyashiro. Hinamizawa initially seems calm and peaceful, but shortly before the festival, Keiichi learns that for four years in a row, murders and disappearances have been taking place on the day of the festival. This chain of incidents remains unsolved and has come to be known as the "Oyashiro Curse" by the superstitious villagers. The day after this year's festival, police discover the corpse of visiting freelance photographer Jirō Tomitake, who appears to have torn his throat out with his bare hands, and the charred body of Miyo Takano, a nurse in the village clinic. In most chapters of the game, Keiichi or one of his friends attempts to investigate the mysteries of Hinamizawa and the Oyashiro Curse, only to succumb to paranoia and homicidal rage. A few days after the festival, Rika's body is found in the family shrine dedicated to Oyashiro. On the same day, a cataclysm befalls the village and wipes out the population, which is explained by the media as a release of swamp gas.

The answer arcs reveal that each preceding arc is an alternate reality in which Rika tried and failed to save herself and her friends. As a priestess of the Furude Shrine, Rika can communicate with the spirit Hanyū, who served as the basis for Oyashiro and is the ancestress of the Furude clan. Each time Rika died, Hanyū would move her to another reality; however, the very ending of Rika's life is not retained in her memories when she transfers, obstructing her from knowing the cause of her death. In the final two chapters, it is revealed that the village's local clinic is secretly a government institute investigating a mysterious parasite in the village that causes Hinamizawa Syndrome; a disease that induces paranoia, delusion, and homicidal rage in its victims before pushing them to tear out their own throats. This disease is responsible for instigating the characters to commit murders in the previous arcs, and some of the incidents in the earlier years were caused by it. The rest of the incidents were caused by Miyo, who had killed Tomitake and faked her death, using the Oyashiro Curse as a cover. Hinamizawa Syndrome manifests in those experiencing extreme stress or those who move a distance away from the "Infection Queen", who releases a pheromone that prevents the aggravation of the villagers' condition. The women of the Furude clan have all acted as Infection Queens, and Rika is the sole remaining member of the line after the death of her parents in the 1981's incident.

The theory by Miyo's adoptive grandfather, Hifumi Takano, is that if there is no Infection Queen, all villagers will succumb to the syndrome, and a mass outbreak of violence will occur. In some of the realities, Shion, succumbing to Hinamizawa Syndrome, kills Rika; however, life in Hinamizawa goes on, showing that Hifumi's theories have been exaggerated. In most of the realities, Miyo kills Rika, and the threat of the mass outbreak convinces the government to massacre the village, with the release of swamp gas being a cover story. Miyo's motive is to vindicate the work of Hifumi and force his work to be recognized after he was mocked and shamed by the government and scientific community for his thesis about the disease. After several hundred loops, Keiichi becomes either vividly or subconsciously aware of the previous realities, allowing him to avoid several critical points where various characters would be murdered or driven insane. In the final loop, the group asks Hanyū to join them, and the spirit manages to manifest a physical body. With her assistance and all of the knowledge and allies they have formed along the way, they thwart Miyo's plan and go on to live happy lives afterward. In the secret ending, Rika travels back to the past to prevent Miyo's suffering from the traumatic childhood that led her to become who she was.

Production

Development
The series is the first visual novel series produced by 07th Expansion. The game director and scenario writer for the series are Ryukishi07, who also drew all of the character illustrations. Background images were taken from photographs taken by Ryukishi07, his younger brother Yatazakura, and Kameya Mannendō. Programming was worked on by Yatazakura, who worked on the main structure, 4U who worked on the intermission and Tips, and BT who worked on the mini games. The games were designed using the game engine NScripter. The music of Higurashi was provided by various music artists including both professionals and dōjin artists, including Dai, the composer of most of the music found in the answer arcs. Ryukishi07 wrote in 2004 how he was influenced by Key's works during the planning of Higurashi no Naku Koro ni. Ryukishi07 played Key's games as a reference, among other visual novels, and analyzed them to figure out the reason why they were found to be so popular. He figured that the secret was due to how the stories would start with ordinary, enjoyable days, but then a sudden occurrence would happen to lead the player to cry due to the shock value. He used a similar model for the basis of Higurashi but instead of leading the player to cry, Ryukishi07 wanted to scare the player with the addition of horror elements. In this way, Ryukishi07 wished to be in some way associated with Key who he described as a "masterpiece maker."

In an interview in the December 2008 issue of Yen Press's Yen Plus manga anthology, Ryukishi07 stated that Higurashi had its origins from an unpublished theater script called  he had written a few years before the first Higurashi game was released. When he decided to rewrite the script and release it, he wanted to build upon "the contrast between a fun, ordinary life, and something terrifying and out of the ordinary." Ryukishi07 was greatly influenced by the worlds of Seishi Yokomizo when developing the universe of Higurashi. Ryukishi07 had decided "early on to design the story so that the truth comes to light by looking at several overlapping stories," though he originally planned to release it as a single game due to initially believing he could finish the story in a single year. The word higurashi is the name of a kind of cicada. Naku means , specifically referring to those sounds made by non-human organisms. According to Ryukishi07, the red Na (な) in the logo is an official part of the title.

Release history

The first game of the Higurashi: When They Cry visual novel series, titled Onikakushi-hen, was released on August 10, 2002. The second game Watanagashi-hen was released on December 29, 2002. The third game Tatarigoroshi-hen was released on August 15, 2003. The fourth game Himatsubushi-hen was released on August 13, 2004. The first four games are part of the question arcs, and the following four games, under the title Higurashi no Naku Koro ni Kai, are part of the answer arcs. The fifth game Meakashi-hen was released on December 30, 2004. The sixth game Tsumihoroboshi-hen was released on August 14, 2005. The seventh game Minagoroshi-hen was released on December 30, 2005. The eighth game Matsuribayashi-hen was released on August 13, 2006. A fan disc titled Higurashi no Naku Koro ni Rei was released on December 31, 2006. A second fan disc titled  was released on August 17, 2014. In January 2021, 07th Expansion announced a remastered version with new music and upscaled graphics titled Higurashi: When They Cry Hō + in development for a Q3 2021 release. It released on January 28, 2022 and featured a new short scenario, Mehagashi-hen, originally a mini-light novel chapter included with the Higurashi Gou BD. It also included a new All-Cast review chapter as a retrospective for the franchise and featured discussion of the Higurashi Gou and Sotsu anime arcs.

The eight original PC games were released in English by MangaGamer under the title Higurashi: When They Cry starting with the first four games released in December 2009 and the last four released in monthly intervals starting in February 2010. MangaGamer's release of the visual novels does not include several background music tracks and two bonus features specific to the original Japanese version: the music room and a minigame. The eight original PC games were also released in French by Saffran Prod under the title Le sanglot des cigales, starting with the first two games released together in November 2009. The Japanese company Seams has done releases for iOS devices in Japanese and English. The Japanese version includes all eight games. The English version is based on the translation by MangaGamer and as of May 2012 includes the first five games. A remastered version of Onikakushi-hen from Higurashi: When They Cry Hō was released by MangaGamer on Steam on May 15, 2015 for Windows, OS X and Linux. The updates include a re-translation, previously cut music tracks and content, the original Japanese text, and alternative character art by illustrator Kurosaki.

A dōjin game named Higurashi Daybreak, based on the Higurashi series and featuring an original scenario by Ryukishi07, was developed by Twilight Frontier, the creators of Immaterial and Missing Power and Eternal Fighter Zero. The gameplay is that of a versus third-person shooter, in which most of the characters of the main Higurashi series are playable. Higurashi Daybreak was first released on August 13, 2006, and an expansion pack followed on April 22, 2007.

Higurashi is the third dōjin game to be ported to a video game console; the first was Hanakisō by HaccaWorks*, and the second was Melty Blood by French-Bread and Ecole. Although Higurashi was the first to have a video game console port announced, its long development time made it the third to be released. It was sold as an append disc to the original Matsuri and as a standalone game. It contains all of Matsuri'''s content, in addition to Matsuribayashi-hen from the original games and other bonus content.

A series of four games for the Nintendo DS under the collective title  with new story arcs are being developed by Alchemist. The first, with the added title , was released on June 26, 2008 containing the first three chapters from the question arcs, and a new chapter entitled Someutsushi-hen, with its story based on the Onisarashi-hen manga series. The second, with the added title , was released in November 2008. The third game in the series, with the added title , was released in March 2009. The final game, subtitled , was released in February 2010.

A PlayStation 3 and PlayStation Vita port titled  and published by Kaga Create was released in Japan on March 12, 2015. This edition features all scenarios from previous versions, in addition to full voice acting, new songs, CGs, minigames and functions. A Nintendo Switch port titled Higurashi: When They Cry Hō and published by Entergram was released in Japan on July 26, 2018. It includes the previous content covered by Sui, in addition to three new scenarios adapted from the Windows version of Hō. A PlayStation 4 port of Higurashi: When They Cry Hō was released by Entergram in Japan on January 24, 2019.

A mobile phone RPG game titled  and planned by D-techno, written by Kiichi Kanō and developed by Smile Axe was released on September 3, 2020. The story stars a new protagonist, Kazuho Kimiyoshi, who visits Hinamizawa in the year 1993. After gaining the power to fight monsters called "Tsukuyami" by Tamurahime-no-Mikoto, Kazuho somehow wanders into Hinamizawa of 1983.

Adaptations
Drama CDs
Several sets of drama CDs based on the series have been released, mainly distributed by Frontier Works and Wayuta. The latter's releases differ from other media adaptations in that they make extensive use of the source material from the original sound novels, and sometimes include original songs from dai's albums. The main eight sound novel arcs have been adapted into a total of eleven CD releases, published by HOBiRECORDS and distributed by Wayuta and Geneon Entertainment, between May 27, 2005 and March 9, 2012; Minagoroshi-hen and Matsuribayashi-hen have been split into two and three separate releases respectively. Each chapter is 200–300 minutes long and contains 3-6 discs. The CDs feature remixes of the games' music and sound effects and the voice cast members have been chosen by Ryūkishi07 himself, though some of them have been changed for the anime and PS2 release due to scheduling conflicts. The booklets included with the CDs contained passwords that, if entered on the official site, unlocked downloads to audio files that adapted the TIPS for each of the arcs. In response to fan requests, audio TIPS for the first five arcs later became available on drama CDs named Append Disc 01, released on December 29, 2005 at Comiket 69, and Append Disc 02, released on October 26, 2007. HOBiRECORDS has also released three drama CDs that adapted several fan-submitted stories from the Kataribanashi-hen novel/manga anthology arc. The first CD was released on April 25, 2007, the second on May 9, 2008, and the third on April 24, 2009.

Frontier Works released several CDs, starting with an anthology piece called Anthology Drama CD 1 on December 22, 2005, followed by a second CD titled Anthology Drama CD 2 on March 24, 2006, and a third CD titled Anthology Drama CD Higurashi no Naku Koro ni featuring Umineko no Naku Koro ni on May 27, 2009. In addition to the anthologies, there have also been numerous character song CDs and DJCDs released during special events such as at Comiket, magazine subscriptions, and anime/film/game pre-orders.

Manga

There are eight main titles in the Higurashi manga series, spanning the four question arcs and the four answer arcs. Each question arc manga are compiled into two bound volumes. The first two answer arc manga are compiled into four volumes, meanwhile Minagoroshi-hen is compiled into six volumes, and Matsuribayashi-hen into eight. The manga uses multiple artists between the various arcs. Karin Suzuragi drew Onikakushi-hen, Tsumihoroboshi-hen, and Matsuribayashi-hen, Yutori Hōjō drew Watanagashi-hen and Meakashi-hen, Jirō Suzuki drew Tatarigoroshi-hen, Yoshiki Tonogai drew Himatsubushi-hen, and Hinase Momoyama drew Minagoroshi-hen. Another manga entitled  is drawn by Yuna Kagesaki and began in Kadokawa Shoten's magazine Comp Ace on August 26, 2008. The manga series was licensed by Yen Press for English distribution in North America under the title Higurashi: When They Cry. The manga was initially serialized in Yen Press' Yen Plus anthology magazine, the first issue of which went on sale on July 29, 2008. The first English volume of the manga was originally planned to be sold in early 2009, but was released in November 2008.

There are three side stories related to the main Higurashi story, but with new characters. The first, named , is drawn by En Kitō and was serialized between March 2005 and July 2006 in Comp Ace. The next, entitled , is drawn by Mimori and was serialized between in GFantasy between 2006 and 2007. A manga adaptation of Higurashis precursor Hinamizawa Teiryūjo began serialization in the debut issue of Square Enix's Big Gangan magazine, sold on October 25, 2011.

A manga spin-off illustrated by Asahi, titled Higurashi no Naku Koro ni Oni, began serialization in Futabasha's Monthly Action magazine on February 25, 2022.

Novels

There are four light novels which contain additional illustrations by five different artists, and seventeen novelizations of the separate visual novel arcs. Each novel is written by Ryukishi07. The light novels were all released as limited editions not sold in stores. The first one, Nekogoroshi-hen, was illustrated by Karin Suzuragi, Yutori Hōjō, and Jirō Suzuki, and was sent out to those who bought the first volume of the manga versions of Onikakushi-hen, Watanagashi-hen, and Tatarigoroshi-hen. One needed to send the cutout stamps in all three of these manga by the deadline to receive this special short story. The second light novel, Kuradashi-hen, was illustrated by Yoshiki Tonogai, Karin Suzuki, Yutori Hōjō, and Mimori. This novel was sent out to those who bought the second volume of the manga version of Himatsubushi-hen, and the first volumes of the manga Tsumihoroboshi-hen, Meakashi-hen, and Yoigoshi-hen. One needed to send the cutout stamps in all four of these manga by a certain deadline to receive this special short story. The third light novel, Hajisarashi-hen, contained illustrations by Rato, and was included with the limited edition of the PlayStation 2 game Higurashi no Naku Koro ni Matsuri.  The fourth novel, Kuradashi-hen Zoku is a sequel to Kuradashi-hen and was sent out to those who bought the second volumes of the manga Tsumihoroboshi-hen, Meakashi-hen, and Yoigoshi-hen. One needed to send the cutout stamps in all four of these manga by a certain deadline to receive this special short story. The light novels were published by Square Enix and released in 2006 and 2007.

Kodansha Box released 17 novelizations of the visual novel arcs with illustrations by Tomohi between August 2007 and March 2009, starting with Onikakushi-hen and ending with Saikoroshi-hen. Most of the story arcs are divided into two volumes, except for Himatsubushi-hen and Saikoroshi-hen which are compiled into one volume each, and Matsuribayashi-hen which is compiled into three volumes. In September 2010, editor Katsushi Ōta confirmed on Twitter that the novelizations would be re-released in bunkobon editions. The re-releases were published by Seikaisha with new cover art by Tomohi from January 12, 2011 to June 8, 2012. In 2020, the series received new bunkobon editions illustrated by Sato Yoshimi, published by Futabasha under the Futabasha Junior Bunko label, starting with Onikakushi-hen on October 23.

Anime

The first anime television series was animated by Studio Deen and produced by Frontier Works, Geneon Entertainment and Sotsu. It is directed by Chiaki Kon, with Toshifumi Kawase handling series composition, Kyūta Sakai designing the characters and Kenji Kawai composing the music. The season covers the four question arcs and the first two answer arcs, and aired in Japan between April 4 and September 26, 2006, comprising 26 episodes. Most of the characters were played by the same voice actors as the drama CD series. The series is available on DVD in Japan, France and North America (following Geneon Entertainment's licensing of the series). However, Geneon's U.S. division announced that it discontinued all ongoing anime projects in September 2007, including Higurashi on November 6, 2007. Only three of a planned six DVDs of Higurashi were released, under the title When They Cry: Higurashi. On July 3, 2008, Geneon and Funimation announced an agreement to distribute select titles in North America. While Geneon still retained the license, Funimation assumed exclusive rights to the manufacturing, marketing, sales and distribution of select titles. Higurashi was one of the several titles involved in the deal. Funimation released a complete box set of the series in August 2009. However, in August 2011, the rights to the series expired due to low sales. Sentai Filmworks has licensed both anime series.

People in Japan, who had bought all nine of the DVDs of the first season, had the chance to receive a special anime DVD entitled Higurashi no Naku Koro ni Gaiden Nekogoroshi-hen, based on the short story that was given to those who had bought the manga. Despite being a bonus for the first season (and having the first season's opening and closing sequences), Nekogoroshi-hen featured Sakai's updated character designs from the second season.

A continuation of the series produced by the same core staff, and based on one new story arc and the final two original answer arcs of the franchise, entitled , aired in Japan between July 6 and December 17, 2007, containing twenty-four episodes. Sentai Filmworks has licensed the second anime series. As the result of a murder case in September 2007 in Japan involving the murder of a police officer by his sixteen-year-old daughter with an axe, as well as the Japanese media relating the case to anime such as Higurashi, the latest episode screenings of both Higurashi no Naku Koro ni Kai and another anime at the time, School Days, were canceled by a number of stations, due to excessive violence. However, AT-X, TV Saitama and Sun TV announced that they would be airing the episodes as planned. Later, TV Saitama announced that they had ceased broadcasting of Higurashi no Naku Koro ni Kai from episode thirteen onwards. Additionally, Higurashi no Naku Koro ni Kai had its opening altered when it re-aired. Originally, a bloody bill hook cleaver (as used by Rena) was shown halfway through (at timestamp 0:55) the opening; it was replaced with an image of a van from the series' fictional junk yard.

An original video animation (OVA) series, entitled , was released on February 25, 2009, and is directed and written by Toshifumi Kawase, with Kazuya Kuroda taking over Sakai's role as character designer. The series also started a limited broadcasting in Bandai Channel prior to DVD release. Sentai Filmworks has licensed the Rei OVAs. The OVA contains three story arcs, Hajisarashi-hen, Saikoroshi-hen and Hirukowashi-hen, with Saikoroshi-hen concluding in three episodes, and the other two arcs concluding in one episode each. Hajisarashi-hen was originally a light novel included with the limited edition of the PlayStation 2 game Higurashi no Naku Koro ni Matsuri, and took the place of Batsukoishi-hen from the Higurashi no Naku Koro ni Rei fandisc. Frontier Works announced another original video anime series,  in March 2011, to celebrate the tenth anniversary of Higurashi no Naku Koro ni. It is directed and storyboarded by Hideki Tachibana and written by Kawase, with Tomoyuki Abe taking over Kuroda's role as character designer and Tomoki Kikuya serving as additional music composer. An OVA film titled , adapted from Ryukishi07's short story "Higurashi Outbreak", was announced in December 2012 and was later released in August 2013. Sakai returned as a character designer for Outbreak.

On January 6, 2020, 07th Expansion and Kadokawa announced that a new anime project by Passione was in production. Akio Watanabe serves as a character designer, and Infinite serves as a producer. Keiichiro Kawaguchi is directing the series, with Naoki Hayashi handling series composition and Kenji Kawai returning as music composer. The main cast will reprise their roles. The series was set to premiere in July 2020, but was delayed to October 2020 due to the COVID-19 pandemic. The series aired from October 1, 2020 to March 19, 2021. The series, entitled , was acquired by Funimation and streamed on its website in North America and the British Isles, and on AnimeLab in Australia and New Zealand. Following Sony's acquisition of Crunchyroll, the series was moved to Crunchyroll. In Southeast Asia and South Asia, Medialink has acquired the series, and are streaming the series on its YouTube channel Ani-One. Before episode 2 aired, the title of the anime was Higurashi: When They Cry – New and it was marketed as a remake to the original anime series. The new series ran for 24 episodes.

After Gou finished airing, a sequel, entitled , was announced. The series aired from July 1 to September 30, 2021. Funimation will stream the series. Following Sony's acquisition of Crunchyroll, the series was moved to Crunchyroll. In Southeast Asia and South Asia, Medialink has acquired the series, and are streaming the series on its YouTube channel Ani-One.

Live-action films
A live-action film adaptation of the series entitled , directed and written by Ataru Oikawa, premiered in Japanese theaters on May 10, 2008. The film is an adaptation of the first story arc, Onikakushi-hen. Gōki Maeda plays Keiichi, Airi Matsuyama plays Rena, Rin Asuka plays Mion, Aika plays Rika, and Erena Ono plays Satoko. A sequel, also live action, was released in Japanese theaters on April 18, 2009 and is entitled . The sequel is based on the Tsumihoroboshi-hen arc, but it incorporates elements from other arcs and has a slightly different ending. The cast, including Maeda as Keiichi, is almost the same as in the previous film, but the role of Ōishi has been changed from Tetta Sugimoto to Ren Osugi.

Live-action series
A live-action television series adaptation directed by Tōru Ōtsuka and starring Yu Inaba as Keiichi premiered in Japan on May 20, 2016 on cable channel BS SKY PerfecTV!. The cast includes the members of NGT48. A four-episode sequel premiered on November 25, 2016.

Music

Unlike visual novels created by established companies, 07th Expansion did not create the music found in the Higurashi games. The music for the question arcs consists of license free songs found on the Internet while the music for the answer arcs was provided by dōjin music artists that were fans of Higurashi. Later, a CD album called Thanks/you was released by the dōjin music artist, Dai; many of his tracks were used in the answer arcs. Fans initially referred to this album as the official soundtrack. However, the actual official soundtrack has since been released for the series, featuring a majority of the songs featured in the answer arcs. This two-disc set is, to date, the most complete collection of songs from the games.

The first season anime's opening theme is "Higurashi no Naku Koro ni" sung by Eiko Shimamiya; it went on sale in Japan on May 24, 2006. The ending theme is "Why, or Why Not" sung by Rekka Katakiri; it was released on June 28, 2006. They were released as two original soundtracks. The series is composed by Kenji Kawai and the albums were produced by Frontier Works. Volume 1 was released on July 21, 2006, and volume 2 was released on October 6, 2006, in Japan. Three character song CDs were also released, sung by voice actors from the anime adaptation, between March 28 and July 25, 2007. The second season anime's opening theme is "Naraku no Hana" also sung by Shimamiya. The first season's opening theme includes a hidden message : the unintelligible lyrics at the beginning ("hanni hara hare hi") were generated by reversing the phrase . The second season's opening theme also includes a reversed part at the end ("ie hanann") which was made by playing backwards the reversed bit from the first opening theme. The ending theme is "Taishō a" performed by anNina. The opening theme for the OVA Higurashi No Naku Koro Ni Kira is "Happy! Lucky! Dochy!" by Yukari Tamura, Mika Kanai, and Yui Horie—the voice actors for Rika, Satoko, and Hanyū, respectively. The ending theme, had four separate versions: one by Mai Nakahara, Rena's voice actor and the others are sung by Yukari Tamura and Mika Kanai, Satsuki Yukino, Mion and Shion's voice actor, and Yui Horie. The opening theme for Gou is "I Believe What You Said" by Asaka. Except for the first episode that uses "Higurashi no Naku Koro ni" by Shimamiya as its ending theme, the ending themes for Gou are "Kamisama no Syndrome" for episodes 2–17 and "Fukisokusei Entropy" for episodes 18–23 by Ayane.
For the first live-action film, a short version of the film's theme song was released on December 22, 2007, in Japan. Once again, Shimamiya sang the song, entitled . Shimamiya also performed the ending theme entitled .

Reception
Visual novels

Over 100,000 copies of the original games were sold in Japan by 2006, a feat not attained by a dōjin game since Type-Moon released Tsukihime. Many fans attribute the game's success to the suspense and horror the novel portrays. Fan-based community boards emerged where fans began discussing their own theories. The popularity of the games grew exponentially as many took interest in their well-outlined script and story, which eventually led the game to be showcased in large gaming magazines with positive reviews. With the announcement of the live-action film adaptation of Onikakushi-hen came the news that over 500,000 copies of the games had been sold, by August 13, 2007. The enhanced PlayStation 2 port, Higurashi no Naku Koro ni Matsuri, had sold 140,397 copies by October 11, 2007. Later console releases in the series, between December 2007 and January 2019, have sold 408,391 copies in Japan, as of February 2019, bringing total software sales to  copies in Japan.

The PS2 version received a total review score of 31/40 (out of the four individual review scores of 9, 8, 8 and 6) from the Japanese gaming magazine Famitsu. The game was voted the tenth most interesting bishōjo game by readers of Dengeki G's Magazine in an August 2007 survey. Its English-language release also received a positive reception from critics. Hardcore Gamer stated that the "writing is incredibly eerie, and amazingly effective" and concluded that "few video games make it anywhere near the skillful story weaving present within the Higurashi series." APGNation stated the "Excellent writing and music make for an evocative reading experience."

Manga
In Japan, the third volume of the manga adaptation ranked as the 19th weekly best-selling book on January 16, 2008. The first volume ranked as the 18th weekly bestseller on June 10, 2008. The fourth volume ranked as the 19th bestseller on January 14, 2009. In the United States, the first volume was ranked 253rd in the top 300 graphic novels sold in November 2008 and ranked as 25th in the top 25 Manga sold in the first quarter of 2009 release of ICv2 Retailers Guide to Anime/Manga.

The manga series had over 8 million copies in circulation by 2009; and over 10 million copies in circulation by 2020.

Debi Aoki of About.com stated that reading the chapters in succession as they were presented in its serialization in Yen Plus made the story "easier to follow" and built the suspense better. Justin Colussy-Estes of Comic Village praised the setting for hinting at something "much darker". He also praised the structure stating that the "mystery develops slowly" to immerse the reader in the characters and then later force the reader to "confront the possibility that one or more of them may be [the] murderer"; a decision he described as "clever". Phil Guie of Popcultureshock expressed that this characterization "is brushed aside" for the horror as it gave the friendship between characters "real depth" adding to the surprise of the plot twists. Anime News Network's Casey Brienza praised the manga for being an "effective" horror story, as it follows a harem manga plot, which "becomes terrifying" producing an effect that is "trashy horror at its absolute greatest". She expressed being surprised by the end of the second volume as the central question remains unanswered though still felt the manga is "wholly enjoyable and satisfying" nonetheless. Brienza stated that although the artwork is "average", the illustrator "seems to know exactly how to transition between the adorable and the abominable—and does so with dramatic, nightmarish effect." Aoki described the artwork as although "pander[ing] to otaku fetishes" containing and awkward character designs, providing "overbearing cutesiness [that] makes the secrets that the girls are hiding behind their smiles just that much creepier."

Anime
Rebecca Silverman from Anime News Network prised the anime series for its storytelling, atmosphere, characters and horror felling, giving it an overall rating of "A-", and stated "Despite some dated artwork, When They Cry holds up really well as a horror title. It has mystery, gore, and an interesting conceit that keeps it interesting from arc to arc, and we're given just enough new information each time the story resets to keep us hooked. It isn't as gruesome as other series, which actually is a plus for squeamish viewers, and this season ends with just enough answers to make us want to know what's really going on. Even if you've seen it before, it's worth rewatching When They Cry because knowing what's coming only makes the story more interesting. Improves on rewatching, builds on itself very well and generally good voices for both languages, scary without being too gross. So come take a trip to Hinamizawa and find out another reason why the devil is in charge of small towns."

A review by The Escapist gave the anime television series a highly positive review. James Henley praised the story, saying that each arc is interesting in its own way, but said that watching Kai was necessary to fully understand the story. He also praised the cast of characters, and how, despite having only one main male character, it never falls into harem genre, and how each one has a unique back story, revealed in different arcs. He criticized the dub as poor quality, but recommended the anime, mainly subbed, if one "can stomach the brutality." The Anime Almanac similarly praised the story, as a unique method of storytelling and the art of the characters, and went to add that the "moe" design on the girls made the scary scenes special. He ultimately recommended the series. Another review, from THEM Anime Reviews, giving it 3 out of 5 stars, praising the story, but panning the sorrow of the characters and the violence, saying "Higurashi is a hard show to watch; while it's interesting, each chapter is progressively soul-sucking and depressing, as the characters struggle desperately to avoid grisly fates, often to no avail, multiple times." He finished the review by saying "...Higurashi'' is interesting and visceral enough to be worth viewing by the more adventurous."

References

External links

 
Higurashi no Naku Koro ni at MangaGamer
Manga official website 
Anime official website 
Novel official website 
Novel official website (Futabasha) 
Higurashi When They Cry - Gou official website 
Higurashi no Naku Koro ni Mei official website 
Higurashi no Naku Koro ni Matsuri official website 
Higurashi no Naku Koro ni Sui official website 
Higurashi no Naku Koro ni Hō official website (Entergram) 

 
2002 video games
2005 manga
2006 anime television series debuts
2006 Japanese novels
2007 Japanese novels
2009 anime OVAs
2011 anime OVAs
Android (operating system) games
Anime and manga about parallel universes
Anime postponed due to the COVID-19 pandemic
Anime television series based on video games
Bishōjo games
Child abuse in fiction
Crunchyroll anime
Doujin video games
Episodic video games
Fiction set in 1983
Fiction with unreliable narrators
Futabasha manga
Gangan Comics manga
Geneon USA
Horror anime and manga
2000s horror video games
IOS games
Light novels
Manga adapted into films
Manga based on video games
Medialink
Mystery anime and manga
Nintendo DS games
NScripter games
OVAs based on video games
Passione (company)
PlayStation 2 games
PlayStation 3 games
PlayStation Vita games
Psychological horror anime and manga
Seinen manga
Sentai Filmworks
Studio Deen
Supernatural anime and manga
Tokyo MX original programming
Video games about crime
Video games about time loops
Video games developed in Japan
Windows games
Yen Press titles
Japanese supernatural horror films
Japanese psychological horror films
Japanese mystery films
Alchemist (company) games
MangaGamer games